Sajau, Sajau Basap, or Sajau-Latti is an Austronesian language spoken by the Punan Sajau and Punan Basap people of Borneo in Indonesia.

References

Punan languages
Languages of Indonesia
Endangered Austronesian languages